Sao Nang Sukantha of Kengtung, later known as Sukantha na Chiengmai (1912 – 15 January 2003), was the wife of Inthanon na Chiengmai. She was the daughter of Kawng Kiao Intaleng of Kengtung State in what is today Myanmar.

Biography 
Sukantha was born at Kengtung Palace, She was the daughter of Sao Kawng Kiao Intaleng and Sao Nang Bodiphlong, his concubine. She has two full siblings, Sao Nang Vaenkiao, Sao Nang Vaendip, Sao Singzai and Sao Kiaomong. Sukantha, a six year old girl, learned to speak Tai Khun and Thai language, Three year laters, She learned to speak Burmese and English. When she finished school she served as a secretary of her father with Sao Nang Bosawan and Sao Nang Debbakaison, her half-sisters.

She married Inthanon na Chiengmai, the son of Kaeo Nawarat, the ninth monarch of Chiang Mai on 13 February 1932 in the Kengtung Palace. Soon after the wedding she went to live with Inthanon at Chiang Mai. They had five children.

Sukantha died on 15 January 2003 at the age of 90. The royal funeral rite took place at Chedi Luang Temple, Chiang Mai. King Bhumibol Adulyadej, Queen Sirikit, Princess Sirindhorn and Princess Chulabhorn sent flower wreaths. The royal cremation was held at San Ku Lek crematorium on 19 January 2003.

References

1912 births
2003 deaths
Chet Ton dynasty
People from Kengtung
People from Chiang Mai province